The 2020 American Athletic Conference men's soccer tournament is scheduled to be the 8th edition of the American Athletic Conference Men's Soccer Tournament. The tournament will decide the American Athletic Conference champion and guaranteed representative into the 2020 NCAA Division I men's soccer tournament. The tournament will begin on 15 April 2021 and concluded on 17 April 2021.

Seeds

Bracket

Matches

Semi-finals

Final

Honors 
Announced after the championship game.

Individual awards 
most outstanding offensive player: Lucca Dourado, F, UCF
most outstanding defensive player: Yannik Oettl, GK, UCF

All-Tournament team 
 Yannik Oettl, GK, UCF
 Lucca Dourado, F, UCF
 Yanis Leerman, D, UCF
 Mauricio Villalobos, M, UCF
 Gino Vivi, F, UCF
 Beto Ydrich, M, UCF
 Skage Simsonen, M, SMU
 Pierre Cayet, D, Temple
 Chase Bromstedt, M, Tulsa
 Jonathan Cervantes, M, Tulsa
 Alvaro Torrijos, F, Tulsa

References

External links 
 2020 AAC Men's Soccer Championship

Tournament
American Athletic Conference men's soccer
American Athletic Conference Men's Soccer Tournament
American Athletic Conference Men's Soccer Tournament
American Athletic Conference Men's Soccer Tournament